The Alliance for Innovation and Justice (BIG) is a minor party in Germany aimed primarily at immigrants of islamic origin.

References

External links
 

2010 establishments in Germany
Political parties of minorities in Germany
Turkish diaspora in Germany
Turkish political parties